Her Man is a 1930 American pre-Code drama film produced and distributed by Pathé Exchange, directed by Tay Garnett and starring Phillips Holmes, Helen Twelvetrees and Marjorie Rambeau. The film is inspired by the ballad Frankie and Johnny. The picture's supporting cast features James Gleason, Ricardo Cortez, Thelma Todd and Franklin Pangborn.

At least one copy is preserved at the Library of Congress. The original camera negative, rediscovered in the 2010s, has been scanned and restored at 4K resolution by Sony Pictures Entertainment, in partnership with the Film Foundation and RT features.

Plot
A Havana prostitute (Twelvetrees) with a sadistic "protector" (Cortez) falls for a young sailor (Holmes).

Cast
Helen Twelvetrees as Frankie Keefe
Phillips Holmes as Dan Keefe
Marjorie Rambeau as Annie
James Gleason as Steve
Ricardo Cortez as Johnnie
Harry Sweet as Eddie
Slim Summerville as The Swede
Thelma Todd as Nelly
Franklin Pangborn as Sport
Stanley Fields as Al
Matthew Betz as Red
Mike Donlin as Bartender
George Chandler as Barfly

Reception
Writing in The New York Times on the release of a restored version of the film, the critic J. Hoberman says that the film was well received when it was released and that it was a favorite of Henri Langlois of the Cinémathèque Française. Hoberman calls out the use of tracking shots in the film, as also does Farran Smith Nehme in Film Comment. The MOMA film curator David Kehr called the "constantly moving camera" 10 years ahead of its time. Nehme describes the film as a "brawling, sleazy pre-Code" and that Garnet successfully "weaves in tenderness" into what is also a romantic film.

References

External links

Her Man! available on YouTube

1930 films
1930 drama films
American black-and-white films
American drama films
1930s English-language films
Films directed by Tay Garnett
Films set in Havana
Pathé Exchange films
1930s American films